Château de Reichenstein is a château in the former commune of Kientzheim (now Kaysersberg Vignoble), in the department of Haut-Rhin, Alsace, France. It has been a listed historical monument since 1996.

It is not to be confused with the eponymous castle near Riquewihr.

References

Châteaux in Haut-Rhin
Monuments historiques of Haut-Rhin